Mario Fernández Cuesta (born 30 April 1988) is a Spanish professional footballer who plays for CD Tropezón as a goalkeeper.

Club career

Racing Santander
Born in Santander, Cantabria, Fernández was a product of Racing de Santander's youth ranks, and was promoted to the main squad for the 2009–10 season, acting as backup to established Toño and Fabio Coltorti. Benefitting from a serious injury to the former, he began being picked for some matches while also representing the reserves in the Segunda División B.

On 6 January 2010, Fernández made his official debut for Racing's first team, in a 3–2 away win against AD Alcorcón in the Copa del Rey; he also featured in the second leg (0–0 draw), adding another two appearances in the tournament as they reached the semi-finals. As the Cantabrians were already safe from relegation, and longtime first-choice Toño was suspended, he made his La Liga debut on 15 May 2011, earning player of the match accolades in the 2–1 loss at Sporting de Gijón.

Osasuna
On 4 August 2015, Fernández signed a two-year deal with CA Osasuna of Segunda División. Mainly a backup to Nauzet Pérez and later demoted to third choice after the arrival of Salvatore Sirigu, he left the club when his contract expired in 2017.

Rayo Vallecano
On 18 August 2017, free agent Fernández joined second-division club Rayo Vallecano on a one-year contract. He only managed two competitive appearances during his tenure at the Campo de Fútbol de Vallecas, with his side returning to the top flight after two years as champions.

Cartagena
Fernández returned to the third tier in the summer of 2018, with the 30-year-old signing for FC Cartagena.

Career statistics

Club

Honours
Rayo Vallecano
Segunda División: 2017–18

References

External links

1988 births
Living people
Spanish footballers
Footballers from Santander, Spain
Association football goalkeepers
La Liga players
Segunda División players
Segunda División B players
Tercera División players
Segunda Federación players
Tercera Federación players
Rayo Cantabria players
Racing de Santander players
CA Osasuna players
Rayo Vallecano players
FC Cartagena footballers
Unionistas de Salamanca CF players
Pontevedra CF footballers
CD Tropezón players
Spain youth international footballers